JoAnne Russell (born October 30, 1954) is an American former professional tennis player.

With playing partner Helen Gourlay Cawley, she won the Wimbledon ladies' doubles title in 1977. They beat the team of Chris Evert and Rosie Casals in the first round and the top-ranked team of Martina Navratilova and Betty Stöve in the final (6–3, 6–3). Russell reached a career-high singles ranking of world No. 11.

Grand Slam finals

Doubles: 1 (1 title)

Mixed doubles: 1 (1 runner-up)

WTA Tour finals

Singles: 3 (2 titles, 1 runner-up)

Doubles: 21 (4 titles, 17 runner-ups)

References

External links
 
 

1954 births
Living people
American female tennis players
Tennis commentators
Wimbledon champions
Grand Slam (tennis) champions in women's doubles
Tennis people from Florida
21st-century American women
Trinity Tigers women's tennis players